Ehud is a Biblical given name, currently common in Israel. The etymology is unknown.

The name "Ehud" was not attested as a first name among Jews until the 20th century. Zionism, as part of its nation-building process—encouraged the use of names of Jewish heroes and warriors of ancient times, such as Ehud, and as a result, it has become a common name in contemporary Israel. Two prime ministers of Israel have had it as a first name: Ehud Barak and Ehud Olmert.

Israelis named Ehud are often nicknamed "Udi".

While the earliest known use is the Hebrew judge, the etymology is unknown. According to Amos Hakham, medieval rabbis favored one of two improbable explanations. Others claimed that the name relates to 'glory' . The modern Israeli Hebrew verb, 'he sympathized'  is unrelated to the Biblical name Ehud. Eliezer Ben-Yehuda coined this verb, deriving it from the Arabic cognate hawadah, 'he treated with indulgence' or kindness. None of the above claims are accepted by contemporary linguists as legitimate etymologies or translations for the name.

Ehud can refer to the following people

Ehud (Ehud ben Gera), Hebrew judge in the Book of Judges
Ehud Olmert, Israeli prime minister from 2006 to 2009
Ehud Barak, Israeli prime minister from 1999 to 2001, minister of defense as of 2007
Ehud "Udi" Adam, retired Israeli general
Ehud Adiv, Israeli, formerly a pro-Palestinian political activist
Ehud Avriel (1917–1980), Israeli politician and diplomat
Ehud Banai (born 1953), Israeli singer and songwriter
Ehud Hrushovski, Israeli mathematician
Ehud Manor (died 2005), Israeli poet and TV personality
Ehud Netzer, Israeli archaeologist
Ehud Shapiro, Israeli scientist
Ehud Sheleg, British-Israeli art dealer
Ehud R. Toledano, Professor of Middle East history at Tel Aviv University and University Chair for Ottoman & Turkish Studies
Ehud Tenenbaum, Israeli hacker
Ehud Vaks, Israeli judo athlete

References 

Hebrew masculine given names